Arecales is an order of flowering plants. The order has been widely recognised only for the past few decades; until then, the accepted name for the order including these plants was Principes.

Taxonomy
The APG IV system of 2016 places Dasypogonaceae in this order, after studies showing Dasypogonaceae as sister to Arecaceae. However, this decision has been called into question.

Historical taxonomical systems 
The Cronquist system of 1981 assigned the order to the subclass Arecidae in the class Liliopsida (= monocotyledons).

The Thorne system (1992) and the Dahlgren system assigned the order to the superorder Areciflorae, also called Arecanae in the subclass Liliidae (= monocotyledons), with the single family Arecaceae.

The APG II system of 2003 recognised the order and placed it in the clade commelinids in the monocots and uses this circumscription:

 order Arecales
 family Arecaceae, alternative name Palmae

This was unchanged from the APG system of 1998, although it used the spelling "commelinoids" instead of commelinids.

References

External links

 NCBI Taxonomy Browser

 
Angiosperm orders
Late Cretaceous plants
Extant Campanian first appearances

es:Arecales